The music of the Chronicles of Narnia film series was recorded and released in conjunction with the post-production and releases of each of the three corresponding films.

Soundtracks
The Chronicles of Narnia: The Lion, the Witch and the Wardrobe (2005) composed by Harry Gregson-Williams.
The Chronicles of Narnia: Prince Caspian (2008) composed by Harry Gregson-Williams.
The Chronicles of Narnia: The Voyage of the Dawn Treader (2010) composed by David Arnold.

Other albums
Music Inspired by The Chronicles of Narnia: The Lion, the Witch and the Wardrobe (2005) collection of songs by various Christian artists that were inspired by the film The Chronicles of Narnia: The Lion, the Witch and the Wardrobe.

Songs
"Waiting for the World to Fall" performed and written by Jars of Clay; produced by Jars of Clay and Mitch Dane.
"Wunderkind" performed by Alanis Morissette; written by Alanis Morissette and Harry Gregson-Williams; produced by Mike Elizondo.
"This Is Home" performed and produced by Switchfoot; written by Jon Foreman, Adam Watts, and Andy Dodd.
"There's a Place for Us" performed by Carrie Underwood; written by Carrie Underwood, David Hodges, and Hillary Lindsey; produced by Mark Bright.
 "The Call" performed by Regina Spektor.

Notable people

Composers
Harry Gregson-Williams
David Arnold

Performers
Jars of Clay
Steven Curtis Chapman
Jeremy Camp
Bethany Dillon
Delirious?
Rebecca St. James
tobyMac
Nichole Nordeman
David Crowder Band
Kutless

Imogen Heap
Alanis Morissette
Tim Finn
Lisbeth Scott
Regina Spektor
Oren Lavie
Switchfoot
Hanne Hukkelberg
Carrie Underwood
Joe McElderry
E.M.D.
Stan Walker
Sonohra

References

The Chronicles of Narnia music
The Chronicles of Narnia (film series)
Film music by media franchise